Bácsborsód is a large village and municipality in Bács-Kiskun county, in the Southern Great Plain region of southern Hungary.

Geography
It covers an area of 72.52 km2 and has a population of 1287 people.

References

Geography of Bács-Kiskun County
Populated places in Bács-Kiskun County